Cryptoblabes trabeata is a species of moth of the family Pyralidae described by Edward Meyrick in 1932. It is found in Fiji and Samoa.

References

Moths described in 1932
Cryptoblabini